João Luiz Ferreira da Silva (born 12 June 1981), known as Preto, is a Brazilian football forward who has played in the Campeonato Brasileiro Série A for Portuguesa, Guarani and Goianiense.

Career
Preto had worked with manager Vágner Benazzi at Portuguesa in 2009 before re-uniting with him at Bragantino in 2012.

References

External links
 João da Silva at Kickersarchiv.de 

1981 births
Living people
People from Novo Hamburgo
Brazilian footballers
Stuttgarter Kickers players
Stuttgarter Kickers II players
Expatriate footballers in Poland
Association football forwards
Sportspeople from Rio Grande do Sul